ChinaAid, also written as China Aid Association or stylized as ChinaAid, is a non-governmental Christian nonprofit which focuses on raising awareness of human rights abuses, providing support and legal aid to Chinese prisoners of conscience and their families, and promoting the rule of law and religious freedom throughout China.

History
After fleeing to Hong Kong as an underground church pastor and a former student leader at Tiananmen Square, Bob Fu escaped to America with his wife, and founded China Aid in 2002 from his new home in Philadelphia. The organization's headquarters were relocated to Midland, Texas, in 2004. Fu believed Midland would be "much safer" after he found Chinese agents tailing him in Philadelphia.

Since 2002, China Aid has been involved in initiatives and campaigns on behalf of human rights advocates and religious freedom groups in China, often leading appeals or campaigns to gain international support on behalf of Chinese nationals.  China Aid also maintains the ongoing China 18 initiative to raise awareness for Chinese prisoners of conscience. Each year, China Aid publishes an Annual Persecution report in both Chinese and English.

According to Bob Fu, the China Aid Association aims to "spiritually and legally [equip]" Chinese people "to defend their faith and freedom", with legal reforms ultimately "softening the soil for the Gospel" in China. The organization's 2010 tax listing lists its purpose as raising funds to pay the legal funds of indicted Christians in China. The foundation funds house churches in China which dissent from the official Protestant and Catholic churches of China. To this end, it publishes a house church magazine with a distribution of 80,000 in China. It also provides money, training, and pen pal programs to Chinese religious leaders and their families. As a matter of policy, it opposes forced abortions and compulsory sterilizations.

In 2010, China Aid received $1.28 million in contributions and grants and $84,741 in other funds. Their staff consisted of 15 paid employees and 40 volunteers. Two years later in 2012, China Aid had a budget of $1.5 million; offices in Midland, Washington, D.C., and Los Angeles; and a full-time staff of "dozens" in China and more than six in America. The organization runs an annual China Aid gala at the Midland Country Club, which raised $400,000 in 2012. Most of the money comes from Midland oil and gas industry donors; in relative terms, China Aid does not receive much support from the Chinese American community. The oil town was the childhood home of George W. Bush and houses many evangelical pressure groups that advocate on behalf of Christians in non-Christian countries like North Korea. Many residents are on the board of China Aid.

The human rights lawyer Li Baiguang died in February 2018.

In 2019, China Aid, represented by Bob Fu, received the Democracy Award for its role as an international non-profit Christian human rights organization committed to promoting religious freedom and the rule of law in China.

Organization and philosophy
China Aid keeps an in-house staff of five to ten at their Midland location, connecting with a network of volunteers across China. According to the ECFA, the organization reported total revenue of $1,426,028, with $1,411,410 coming from donations in 2013. Expenses that year were $1,493,194. China Aid offers financial and legal support for house church pastors, political dissidents, and prisoners of conscience. Most of China Aid's donations come from oil and gas industry philanthropists. Other donations come from local churches or other Christian ministries.

China Aid currently partners with various other ministries and human rights groups, such as National Endowment for Democracy, Freedom House, The Voice of the Martyrs, Christian Solidarity Worldwide, Release International, and International Christian Concern.

According to the organization's website, China Aid's mission is threefold: to "expose, encourage, and equip." The news and reporting side of China Aid's operations seek to "expose the abuses" and reveal persecution and human rights abuses to raise awareness of injustices perpetuated in China. Financial contributions and support for individuals and groups who have been targeted "encourages the abused." Finally, China Aid organizes training in leadership and rule of law for organizations in China to "equip the leaders."

Initiatives

China 18 
The China 18 are a diverse group of prisoners of conscience supported by a China Aid-led coalition. The members of the group include human rights lawyers, Tibetans, Uyghurs, political activists, and underground church leaders. The China 18 campaign is intended to raise awareness for the situations of these individuals and their families, to represent thousands of others in similar situations, and to press for their release. The 18-person roster is updated to reflect new cases as members are freed or deceased. As of September 2015, the 18 cases of the China 18 were Wang Bingzhang, Peng Ming, Liu Ping, Liu Xiaobo, Zhu Yufu, Liu Xianbin, Yang Tianshui, Yang Rongli, Guo Quan, Guo Feixiong, Tang Jingling, Li Chang, Alimujiang Yimiti, Gulmira Imin, Khenpo Karma Tsewang, Gao Yu, Zhang Shaojie.

Previous members of the China 18 who have been released are Lobsang Tsering, Chen Kegui, Wang Zhiwen, Gao Zhisheng, and Dhondup Wangchen. As of September 2015, only one previous member has died while still in prison, Tenzin Delek Rinpoche.

Free Gao 
In 2009, China Aid headed a campaign to free former China 18 member Gao Zhisheng, including a petition to the United States Senate, then Secretary of State Hillary Clinton, and the Chinese embassy which received over 50,000 signatures. Gao was freed in August 2014, but was moved into house arrest and remains in poor health from his imprisonment.

Advocacy Events 
China Aid leads advocacy efforts to promote awareness and garner support for cases and issues, often partnering with other human rights or China-focused NGOs. Often these efforts include drawing up petitions, writing open letters to important government officials, or hosting events. Frequent partners include other ministries and human rights groups, such as, Freedom House, Reporters Without Borders, Amnesty International, Human Rights Watch, International Campaign for Tibet, and Uyghur Human Rights Project.

Chen Guangcheng 
In 2012, China Aid was instrumental in gaining asylum in the US for dissident lawyer Chen Guangcheng after his research discovered 130,000 forced abortions in Shandong. The organization helped him flee house arrest and escape to the American Embassy in Beijing. With additional help from China Aid, he was able to escape to New York on a student visa. China Aid was often the first to release news and updates on Chen's condition and situation throughout his escape and relocation.

References

External links
 
 

Christian advocacy groups
Persecution of Christians
International human rights organizations
Human rights organizations based in the United States
Organizations established in 2002
Charities based in Texas
Foreign charities operating in China